The November 2006 San Francisco general elections were held on November 7, 2006 in San Francisco, California. The elections included five seats to the San Francisco Board of Supervisors, positions for San Francisco assessor-recorder and public defender,  and eleven San Francisco ballot measures.

Assessor-Recorder 
Incumbent assessor-recorder Phil Ting won reelection unopposed.

Public defender 
Incumbent public defender Jeff Adachi won reelection unopposed.

Board of Supervisors

Propositions 

Note: "City" refers to the San Francisco municipal government.

Proposition A 

Proposition A would authorize the San Francisco Unified School District to issue $450 million worth of bonds, funded by a property tax increase, to modernize and repair school facilities, and create a citizens' oversight committee to monitor expenditures. This proposition required a majority of 55% to pass.

Proposition B 

Proposition B would require the Board of Supervisors to create parental leave policies permitting Board members and members of other City boards and commissions to attend meetings via teleconference due to pregnancy, childbirth, and other related conditions.

Proposition C 

Proposition C would require the Civil Service Commission to set the base salaries of the Mayor, city attorney, district attorney, public defender, assessor-recorder, city treasurer, and sheriff based on the average salaries of comparable officials in other Bay Area counties.

Proposition D 

Proposition D would prohibit the City and its contractors from disclosing personal information about individuals except in limited circumstances.

Proposition E 

Proposition E would increase the City parking tax from 25% to 35% and extend the tax to include valet parking services even if the valet company does not pay for the property where it parks its cars.

Proposition F 

Proposition F would require employers to provide paid sick leave to its employees in San Francisco.

Proposition G 

Proposition G would require formula retail use stores to seek Planning Commission conditional use approval before opening a new store in Neighborhood Commercial Districts which permit such stores.

Proposition H 

Proposition H would require landlords to provide relocation assistance to eligible residential tenants when evicting them due to no fault of their own.

Proposition I 

Proposition I would make it City policy for the Mayor to appear in person at a regularly scheduled Board of Supervisors meeting monthly for formal policy discussions with the Board.

Proposition J 

Proposition J would make it City policy to call for the impeachment of President George W. Bush and Vice President Dick Cheney.

Proposition K 

Proposition K would make it City policy to acknowledge the housing needs of seniors and disabled adults with little financial means and to explore ways of addressing their needs.

References 

 San Francisco Voter Information Pamphlet / Sample Ballot, November 7, 2006, Department of Elections of the City and County of San Francisco.

External links
 San Francisco Department of Elections

San Francisco 11
2005 11
Elections 11
San Francisco 11
2000s in San Francisco